Brendan McManus (2 December 1923 – September 2010) was a former professional footballer, who played for Newry Town, Huddersfield Town, Oldham Athletic and Bradford City. He was born in Kilkeel, Northern Ireland. He was a goalkeeper who played 161 Football League matches before playing non-league football with Frickley Colliery and Scarborough.

References

1923 births
2010 deaths
People from Kilkeel
Association footballers from Northern Ireland
Association football goalkeepers
English Football League players
Newry City F.C. players
Huddersfield Town A.F.C. players
Oldham Athletic A.F.C. players
Bradford City A.F.C. players
Scarborough F.C. players
Frickley Athletic F.C. players